The Journal of Radioanalytical and Nuclear Chemistry is a peer-reviewed scientific journal published by Springer Science+Business Media.  It publishes original papers, review papers, short communications and letters on nuclear chemistry. Some of the subjects covered are nuclear chemistry, radiation chemistry, nuclear power plant chemistry, radioanalytical chemistry, and environmental radiochemistry.

Impact factor 
The Journal of Radioanalytical and Nuclear Chemistry had a 2014 impact factor of 1.034, ranking it 15th out of 34 in the subject category "Nuclear Science and Technology", 57th out of 74 in "Analytical Chemistry", and 31st out of 44 in "Inorganic and Nuclear Chemistry".

Editor 
The founding editor in chief is Tibor Braun.

Indexing
This journal is indexed by the following services:

Science Citation Index
Journal Citation Reports/Science Edition, 
Scopus 
Inspec 
EMBASE 
Chemical Abstracts Service (CAS)
CSA Environmental Sciences
CAB International
 CAB Abstracts 
 Current Contents/Physical, Chemical and Earth Sciences 
 Food Science and Technology Abstracts
 GeoRef 
 Global Health 
 INIS Atomindex 
 Referativnyi Zhurnal/VINITI

References

External links 

Chemistry journals
Springer Science+Business Media academic journals
Publications established in 1968
English-language journals
Monthly journals